Lake Buckhorn is a census-designated place (CDP) in Mechanic Township, Holmes County, Ohio, United States. As of the 2020 census it had a population of 720. It is a private, members-only gated community. The community is built around  Lake Buckhorn, a reservoir impounded in 1967.

Geography
Lake Buckhorn is in south-central Holmes County on a tributary of Doughty Creek, a southwest-flowing tributary of Killbuck Creek and part of the Walhonding River watershed flowing to the Ohio River. Ohio State Route 83 forms the eastern boundary of the community. The highway leads north  to Millersburg, the Holmes county seat, and south  to Coshocton.

Demographics

References

External links
Lake Buckhorn - Millerburg, Ohio

Census-designated places in Holmes County, Ohio
Census-designated places in Ohio